

Felix and Januarius were two Christian martyrs. Their acts and the year of their martyrdom has not survived, but it is placed in Heraclea.Their feast day was observed jointly on January 7.

See also
 Other saints Felix
 Other saints Januarius

References

Christian martyrs